N2O is the chemical formula for Nitrous oxide.

N2O or N2O may also refer to:

 N2O Records, a music label
 N2O (video game), a video game

See also 
 N20 (disambiguation) (N twenty)